In education, an entrance examination or admission examination is an examination that educational institutions conduct to select prospective students. It may be held at any stage of education, from primary to tertiary, even though it is typically held at tertiary stage.

By country

France 
In France, the Concours Général, taken in the last year of High School (Lycée), is considered to be particularly difficult with only 250 places in all subjects for 15,000 applicants.This is although not an examination because it's purely honorary and doesn't grant anything.  There is also an entrance examination in order to enter medicine studies. Grandes écoles of engineering and grandes écoles of business are some other examinations, to prepair for which students are studying two years in Classe préparatoire aux grandes écoles.

India 

In India, entrance examinations are chiefly confined to medicine, engineering, and management. These range from the BITSAT and the IIT-JEE -where less than one in a hundred can hope to get admission- to state entrance examinations, which are many and varied. The stiff competition has led to a situation where many students neglect their school studies and focus solely on 'entrance coaching' which is time-consuming and expensive. This has led many states to scrap the entrances and base admissions on the school leaving marks which, unfortunately are none too reliable. Experts point out that in a country where many different boards are present common entrances are essential, but application skills rather than cramming should be stressed on. Frequent changes in the pattern of examination are essential since sticking to a 'standard text' or 'standard pattern' alone will favour the coaching industry and the rote-learners.

Entrance Examinations in India trace their roots to the University of Calcutta, which when established in 1857, introduced the practice to decide eligibility for admission. In that exam, one student qualified for every four candidates. In the absence of a standardized school graduation examination, the University's entrance examinations were used as a substitute, known later as Matriculation examinations. Post-independence, India has different systems of education whose syllabus and examination process are governed by both central and state-based statutory boards. Grades 10 and 12 which mark the culmination of secondary and higher secondary education, have standardized final examinations, referred to as the Secondary School Leaving Certificate (SSLC) examination after grade 10 (class X) and the Higher Secondary Examination(HSC) after grade 12th.

United Kingdom 
One-half of British universities have lost confidence in the grades that are awarded by secondary schools, and require many applicants to sit for a competitive entrance examination or other aptitude test. According to the Schools Minister, “strong evidence has been emerging of grade inflation across subjects” in recent years.

COVID-19 Impact 

Due to the presence of COVID-19 in many countries which embraced school closures either on state or national scale, some entrance examinations for high schools were eventually cancelled to reduce the stress of students and the possibility of COVID-19 infection impact during the attendance.

See also 

Civil service entrance examination
Competitive examination
High-stakes testing
List of admission tests to colleges and universities
National Eligibility cum Entrance Test (Postgraduate)
Selective school
Standardized test
Test (assessment)
Vestibular exam

References 

School examinations